Pterorhodin is a pteridine pigment found in animals and plants. It has been extracted in melanosomes of tree frogs, butterflies, and plants as a wine red pigment. In lemur tree frogs, pterorhodin allows skin to reflect the sun's heat. Pterorhodin gives pigment color to bristle worms and is found in the iris of multiple bird species including the red-eyed vireo and the common loon.

References

Pteridines